Mario Prestifilippo (– September 29, 1987) was a member of the Sicilian Mafia.

He was briefly the boss of the Ciaculli Mafia Family after Giuseppe Greco was murdered in 1985. He played a significant role in the Second Mafia War of the early 1980s orchestrated by Salvatore Riina. He was supposedly under the orders of Michele Greco but Greco was himself regarded as little more than a puppet of Riina.

Prestifilippo was shot to death as he sped through the streets of Bagheria on September 29, 1987 on a motorbike, moving from one hiding place to another. He was killed because he protested against the execution of Pino Greco, who was a close friend of his. At the time of his death he was a fugitive, suspected of dozens of murders, and was being tried in absentia at the Maxi Trial.

References

Stille, Alexander (1995), Excellent Cadavers. The Mafia and the Death of the First Italian Republic, Vintage 

1987 deaths
Sicilian mafiosi
Greco Mafia clan
Murdered Mafiosi
People murdered in Italy
Year of birth uncertain